Colonial Survey is a 1957 collection of science fiction short stories by American writer Murray Leinster.  It was first published by Gnome Press in 1957 in an edition of 5,000 copies.  The collection was reprinted by Avon Books in 1957 under the title The Planet Explorer.  The stories all originally appeared in the magazine Astounding.

Contents
 "Solar Constant"
 "Sand Doom"
 "Combat Team"
 "The Swamp Was Upside Down"

Reception
Galaxy reviewer Floyd C. Gale praised the collection as "the gadget story raised to new heights. . . . Leinster pulls his miracles out of a hat labeled Deus ex perspiration and makes them completely credible."

References

Sources

External links

1957 short story collections
Science fiction short story collections
Works originally published in Analog Science Fiction and Fact
Works by Murray Leinster
Gnome Press books